Anthony "Tony" Felloni (born Anthony Carroll, 1943) is an Irish heroin dealer, pimp and career criminal. He became a hate figure in the 1980s and 1990s, blamed for "flooding" Dublin with heroin and creating the city's first generation of "junkies."

Early life
Felloni was born in Dublin in 1943 to Renaldo Felloni (an Italian immigrant) and a Miss Carroll. As his parents were not married, he was given his mother's surname, calling him Anthony Carroll.

Carroll adopted his father's surname in 1959. He married Anne Marie Flynn in 1969.

Criminal career
Carroll began as a blackmailer; he would seduce impressionable women from rural areas and force them to pose for nude photographs, threatening to send the pictures to their parents unless they paid him. He later began to force women into prostitution; in 1964 he was convicted of "procuring young girls for immoral purposes". In the 1970s he turned to burglary.

In 1980 Felloni moved to Great Britain and began to work in the growing drugs trade; he was arrested in Surrey in 1981 and jailed for four years for conspiracy to import heroin. He returned to Dublin and was again imprisoned in 1986 for heroin dealing, receiving a ten-year sentence, and being paroled in 1993.

In the 1980s and '90s he was one of Dublin's largest heroin suppliers, after usurping Larry Dunne's position as the city's main dealer. His children worked as couriers and tasters, many of them being later imprisoned. Ali Bracken claimed in the Sunday Tribune that "He enlisted his children to help him sell heroin when they were just teenagers and encouraged them to experiment with the drug so that he could control them."

In June 1996 Felloni was sentenced to twenty years' imprisonment for heroin trafficking. Assets of over IR£400,000 were seized in 1998; it was estimated that Felloni had earned £875,000 from drug dealing since 1988.

In 1998, Paul Reynolds published King Scum: The Life and Crimes of Tony Felloni, a bestselling book about Felloni and his criminal career.

In 2010, Gardaí seized another €500,000 from the family. Felloni was released in January 2011 after serving  years; at 67 years old and suffering from AIDS, he was not expected to return to crime.

Personal life
Felloni's wife is the sister of Dublin politician Mannix Flynn. He had six children with her and two more with a mistress. Most of his children were part of the Felloni crime network, many of them developing heroin addictions and HIV. Felloni was also physically abusive to Anne Marie, being three times convicted of assaulting her.

References

Irish people of Italian descent
Drug dealers
20th-century Irish criminals
Criminals from Dublin (city)
Irish drug traffickers
Pimps